Flerida is a given name. Notable people with the name include:

 Flérida de Nolasco (1891–1976), Dominican scholar and literary critic 
 Flerida Ruth Pineda-Romero (1929–2017), Associate Justice of the Supreme Court of the Philippines